My Silver Lining may refer to:

 "My Silver Lining" (First Aid Kit song), 2014
 "My Silver Lining" (Mickey Gilley song), 1979